The Winter Equestrian Festival (WEF) is an annual equestrian festival running for 12 weeks between January and April in Wellington, Florida. Each of the 12 weeks is considered its own horse show, with separate competitions, as well as competitions that run throughout the festival.  It is the largest and longest-running equestrian competition in the world.  The Winter Equestrian Festival is known for its stunning grounds and villages, stiff competition, and wealth of its participants.

The Palm Beach International Equestrian Center, which hosts the equestrian festival, is a  venue in Wellington. The ground of the festival consist of, 18 competition arenas, as well as 256 permanent horse stalls. The Winter Equestrian Festival (WEF) is known for its sprawling grounds and horse themed streets. Competitors and residents can access over 57 miles of different trails surrounding the equestrian facility.  The Grand Prix Village is known to house the most elite competitors and for its exclusive locations just walking distance from the festival.

Participants range from two to seventy years old and bring with them an estimated 6,000 horses. The competition has a wide range of divisions for people of all skill level. It offers competitions for children, junior, adult amateur, and professional equestrians in over 70 different divisions In the course of three months, this largest and longest running horse show sees only the best riders of their class: Olympians, adult amateurs, juniors, and children from more than 42 different countries.  Among these people and horses are some of the best riders for each division, of those athletes, The United States, and World: #1, Kent Farrington, World #2 Maclain Ward, Canada's prized rider and also ranked 8th in the world, Eric Lamaze.

WEF began to attract the equestrian community after the 1970s. What initially began to draw the wealthy participants was the established International Polo Club.  The 2015 WEF awarded over $8.2 million in prize money, and more than $9 million in 2018. The competitors aren't the only elite ones attending the festival, the horses are among the best money can buy and with more than 5,000 horses on property their net worth totals well over half a billion The wealth of the participants is a huge staple in the culture of the Winter Equestrian Festival. Some of the members are a movie actor, a baseball star, and approximately 5 billionaires, among the five two of the world's top twenty richest people.

Since 2021, strict measures are undertaken for everyone's safety, such as wearing masks and social distancing.

References

External links 
 Palm Beach International Equestrian Center

Wellington, Florida
Equestrianism
Equestrian festivals
Festivals in Florida
1970s establishments in Florida